The 1960 Icelandic Cup was the first edition of the National Football Cup.

It took place between 11 August 1960 and 23 October 1960, with the final played at Melavöllur in Reykjavik between KR Reykjavik and Fram Reykjavik. Teams from the Úrvalsdeild karla (1st division) did not enter until the quarter finals. In prior rounds, teams from the 2. Deild (2nd division), as well as reserve teams, played in one-legged matches. In case of a draw, the match was replayed.

First round

Second round

Quarter finals 
 Entrance of 5 clubs from 1. Deild

Semi finals

Final

See also 

 1960 Úrvalsdeild
 Icelandic Cup

External links 
 1960 Icelandic Cup results at the site of the Icelandic Football Federation 

Icelandic Men's Football Cup
Iceland
1960 in Iceland